The Truth About Love is the sixth studio album by American singer-songwriter Pink. It was released on September 14, 2012, through RCA Records. After giving birth to her first child in 2011, Pink started working on the album with longtime collaborator Billy Mann. With hopes of becoming more involved in the production of the album, she also reunited with Greg Kurstin and Butch Walker. Recording sessions took place between January and May 2012. The Truth About Love is primarily a pop record and includes elements of electropop, dance-pop, and rock music. Its lyrics explore themes of love, monogamy, and sexuality, as evidenced by the album title. The songs on the album express various perspectives towards romance and delve into the realities of long-term relationships. It features guest appearances by Eminem, Lily Allen, and Nate Ruess.

The album received generally positive reviews from music critics, who commended Pink's thematic and musical direction. Buoyed by extensive marketing, The Truth About Love was a commercial success, topping the charts in eight countries, including Australia, Canada, Germany, and Sweden. In the United States, it became Pink's first number-one album on the Billboard 200 chart and was later certified triple platinum by the Recording Industry Association of America (RIAA) for sales of three million album-equivalent units. In Australia, The Truth About Love became the first album to top the year-end chart for two consecutive years and was certified nine times platinum by the Australian Recording Industry Association (ARIA). It was ranked as the seventh best-selling album of 2012, with sales of 2.6 million copies sold worldwide. By 2016, the album had sold over seven million copies globally.

Six tracks from the album were released as singles. "Blow Me (One Last Kiss)", the album's lead single, was released on July 2, 2012, and peaked at number five on the US Billboard Hot 100. The second single, "Try", attained the top-ten position in several countries worldwide, including Australia, Canada, Germany, the UK, and the US. It was followed by "Just Give Me a Reason", which topped the record charts in over ten countries worldwide and became Pink's fourth number-one single on the Billboard Hot 100. "True Love" charted moderately in various countries, while the album's other singles, "Walk of Shame" and "Are We All We Are", had a limited release. The album was further promoted through The Truth About Love Tour (2013–2014), which grossed $183 million upon completion. The Truth About Love was nominated for Best Pop Vocal Album at the 55th Annual Grammy Awards.

Background and development
In November 2010, Pink released her first greatest hits album, titled Greatest Hits... So Far!!!. The album spawned two singles, "Raise Your Glass" and "Fuckin' Perfect", which achieved commercial success, peaking at number one and number two, respectively, on the US Billboard Hot 100. On June 2, 2011, Pink gave birth to her first child, a daughter named Willow Sage Hart. Despite media speculation that Pink would take an extended break from music to focus on motherhood, her management team suggested in an interview with American Top 40 that the singer could release a new album next year.

In March 2012, Pink confirmed via Twitter that she had begun working on her sixth studio album. In an open letter to her fans posted on her official website, she detailed the process of crafting the record, saying, "I'm putting my heart and soul into every song and there's a lot of that these days. This little girl has expanded me and what I am capable of feeling as a human". Pink later appeared on the cover of Cosmopolitan in June 2012. While discussing her return to the music scene, Pink revealed that the album was set to be released during the fall of the same year, and that she worked on new music with Billy Mann, among others. She added, "I've been in mommy mode, and I'm just starting to get back out there into the real world. I've been in the studio recording my new album, so now it feels like everything is falling back into place."

Writing and recording
The development process of The Truth About Love took place between January and May 2012. Pink recorded the album in sessions at Earthstar Creation Center in Venice, Conway Recording Studios in Los Angeles, Suite 203, and The Modern Dirt Laboratories in London, UK. Before starting to work on the album, Pink contemplated how to successfully balance her music career and being a mother. In an interview for Rolling Stone, she explained, "Every album, I'm worried that I'm a dork and a fraud – what if I can't sing anymore? Then I stop thinking and start playing guitar, and I realize that it's ok to suck, and move forward". While her previous albums were created by working every day until the early morning, Pink said becoming a mother has changed the process of making music, essentially complying with a strict routine. Recording sessions were therefore held only from Monday to Friday between 1 p.m. and 10 p.m., with breaks for nursing her daughter and having dinner. Weekends were off and dedicated to family time.

For The Truth About Love, Pink enlisted the help of her longtime collaborators, Billy Mann, Butch Walker, and Max Martin, as well as first-time collaborators Jeff Bhasker and Dan Wilson. Pink recalled that she started working on the album as "an experiment", and first met with Mann because she felt safe in a "no-shame zone" with him. She also reunited with record producer Greg Kurstin, with whom the singer had not collaborated since her fourth studio album, I'm Not Dead (2006). Noting that they shared great camaraderie, Pink felt that Kurstin would align with her musical ideas and elevate her production and musicality. Approximately 40 songs were written during the album's development process; Pink said she would write ideas for songs in her journal. The title track was the song that made her realize the project was taking a definite form and had a cohesive theme of love.

Pink drew inspiration for her songwriting from the various emotions she had experienced in her "exhausting search" for love, as well as the year she and husband Carey Hart were separated, admitting she was "still exorcising some demons". Explaining her writing process, Pink told Daily News that the record reflects her life at the time and her newfound happiness, inspired by motherhood. She continued, "Everything's a song. It's just a lot more fun. [...] I think that's a new thing for me. I was having a lot more fun than I was having before". She also sought to incorporate more musicality and raise the bar for herself, being more interested in the production aspects. Kurstin considered that the creative process was not difficult because Pink would compose lyrics fast once she felt inspired, comparing her work ethic with a stream of consciousness. Every day spent in the studio resulted in the completion of a new song, and Pink would record just "one or two takes", which, according to Kurstin, were "usually amazing".

Every song on the album was co-written by Pink, with the exception of "Try", which was written by Michael Busbee and Ben West, and was originally recorded in 2010 by their former band GoNorthToGoSouth. They later pitched  "Try" to Rani Hancock, an A&R executive of RCA Records, hoping to give the song to Kelly Clarkson or Daughtry. A demo version was also recorded by Adam Lambert, but according to Busbee, he "just wasn't the right fit". After hearing it at a label meeting, the director of RCA agreed to pitch the song to Pink. Pink accepted the offer to record "Try", which Busbee said "was one of the first outside songs she had recorded in a long time". The concept of "Just Give Me a Reason" was developed during a songwriting session with Bhasker and Nate Ruess. Bhasker was introduced to Pink by Peter Edge, an executive of RCA Records. Pink approached Ruess because she was captivated by his "intense incredible" voice. After the first verse was written, Pink later worked on the lyrics at home. She envisioned that the song's conversational nature demanded another collaborator, and selected Ruess to be a guest vocalist. However, he was ambivalent about singing a duet with Pink because he only recorded a demo for the track. Nonetheless, Pink persuaded Ruess to record "Just Give Me a Reason" in a duet after "many, many months of convincing". She concluded; "I totally tricked him into doing it and I'm so glad that I was able to because no one could have done it better, and I think now he's very happy that he did it".

Music and lyrical interpretation

Overview

The Truth About Love has been characterized as a pop album that incorporates elements of electropop, dance-pop, and rock music. The album consists mostly of "shouty" pop songs with "radio-gripping hooks" and confessional power ballads. According to Jon Pareles of The New York Times, the album's instrumentation makes use of "dance beats, rock guitars, piano hymns, string orchestras, and hip-hop loops". Pink described The Truth About Love as a personal rock and roll record about monogamous relationships and different perspectives towards love, including "dark, light, happy, [and] sad", as well as "exploring how much it can hurt and how much it can feel good". Lyrical contents on the album are centered around Pink's recurring themes of love, sex, self-reliance, long-term relationships, and rebellion. The Truth About Love is a marked change in Pink's vocal style; she had quit smoking and expanded her upper vocal range by an octave.

Stephen Thomas Erlewine from AllMusic noted that the album explored more "grown-up emotions" and Pink "embracing every one of her contradictions". Kyle Anderson of Entertainment Weekly remarked the album's concept of expressing the darker side of love with "righteous anger [and] irreverence", while Sarah Godfrey of The Washington Post identified its tracks as "aggressive, attitudinal love songs". Mesfin Fekadu from the Associated Press summarized The Truth About Love as a "rollercoaster of emotions", comparing the album with "watching a reality show about the ups and downs of her relationship with her husband". Similarly, Christina Lee of Idolator suggested that the album documented Pink's year-long separation from her husband and her overall tumultuous relationship, pointing out the singer's realization that "the love of your life can also cause the heartbreak of your life".

Songs analysis

The album opens with "Are We All We Are", a self-empowering protest song featuring instrumentation of "crashing drums", keyboards, and disorientated synthesizers. According to Diane Anderson-Minshall of The Advocate, lyrics such as "We are the people that you'll never get the best of" are inspired by economic inequality and the Occupy Wall Street movement. Described as a breakup anthem, the next track, "Blow Me (One Last Kiss)", is an upbeat electropop song with "Modest Mouse-style rock riffs" and "snappy guitars". The song drew comparisons to Kelly Clarkson's "Stronger (What Doesn't Kill You)" for having a similar sound; both songs were produced by Kurstin. The third track, "Try", is a 1980s-influenced power ballad about a damaged relationship and taking risks with love. It is followed by "Just Give Me a Reason", a duet with Nate Ruess. The lyrics find Pink pleading with a partner as they strive to stay together.

The album's fifth track, "True Love", is a humorous ska-pop and pop-rock song, with guest vocals from Lily Allen. Lyrically, it has been described as "a celebration of dysfunctional love" and retells aspects of Pink's riotous relationship. A 1970s inspired glam rock and blues number, "How Come You're Not Here?" shows Pink's furious side at a partner who may be in love with someone else. It contains distorted vocals, layered guitars, and bells played by Pink's daughter, Willow. "Slut Like You" is an electroclash song whose tongue-in-cheek lyrics talk about female empowerment and owning one's sexuality. Critics found similarities between the track and Blur's 1997 single, "Song 2", as well as references to the 1983 American crime drama film, Scarface. The next track on The Truth About Love is the title track, a retro 1960s influenced song. Its subject matter centers around the realities of a long-term relationship.

"Beam Me Up" is an acoustic ballad about taking a break from reality and longing to be with someone who has died. Pink revealed that the song was written "through a lot of tears" and was inspired by a close friend whose child had died. The tenth track, "Walk of Shame", is an anthemic new wave song about the embarrassment and regret on the morning after a one-night stand. Described as an "alternative club banger", the dance-inflected "Here Comes the Weekend" features guest vocals by Eminem. The song revolves around letting loose at a party, as she sings on the chorus, "Here comes/ Comes the weekend hear it calling like a siren/ We don't look for trouble/ Just enough to seeing double". It is followed by "Where Did the Beat Go?", a midtempo R&B song with military drums and multi-layered vocals. Its lyrics display a vulnerable Pink questioning a relationship falling apart and no longer feeling desired. The album's final song of the standard edition, "The Great Escape", is a piano ballad. Its somber lyrics explore themes of medication, going through difficult times, and contemplating suicide.

The deluxe version of The Truth About Love continues with the track "My Signature Move", an anthemic pop-rock song produced by Walker, while "Is This Thing On?" contains influences of four-on-the-floor. The next song is "Run", an emotional power ballad dedicated to Pink's daughter, with lyrics such as the opening lines, "Remember make believe in you/ All the things I said I'd do/ I wouldn't hurt you, like the world did me/ Keep you safe, I'd keep you sweet". The final track of the deluxe edition, "Good Old Days", is characterized by  "a refreshing, live-in-the-moment" message and melancholic lyrics.

Release and artwork

In 2011, RCA Music Group announced that it would be disbanding Jive Records, Arista, and J Records. With the shutdown, all artists previously signed to those labels, including Pink, would release their future material through RCA Records. Pink announced the album title during an interview on Australia's Today on July 4, 2012. The following day, she confirmed the album's release date as September 17, 2012 in the United Kingdom, and a day later in the United States. The album's artwork was unveiled through Pink's official website on July 16, 2012. Photographed by Andrew Macpherson, it depicts the singer with her "signature" pink hair crouching down and donning a short black top, short black shorts, garters, and red heels.

On September 4, 2012, Pink announced that she partnered with the American retail company Target for a promotional campaign. The partnership included the release of an exclusive, deluxe edition of The Truth About Love album, featuring four extra tracks, and Pink appearing in television commercials for Target to promote the album. A special Fan Edition of the album was released in November 2012. In addition to the standard version of the album, the Fan Edition contains six additional songs, as well as a DVD containing the music videos of "Blow Me (One Last Kiss)" and "Try", four live performances from a special The Truth About Love concert held in Los Angeles, and exclusive scenes from the album photoshoot.

Promotion

Live performances

To bolster album sales, Pink and RCA Records implemented an extensive marketing plan for the album. At the 2012 MTV Video Music Awards, Pink gave the first televised performance of "Blow Me (One Last Kiss)", which she also performed on September 10, 2012, on The Ellen DeGeneres Show and Le Grand Journal. Three days later, Pink sang at the 2012 iTunes Festival at Roundhouse, in London. On September 14, 2012, Pink appeared on Alan Carr: Chatty Man, where she was interviewed and performed "Blow Me (One Last Kiss)". Concurrent with the album's release in Germany, Pink held a special concert at Circus Krone, in Munich. Songs performed included "Are We All We Are", "How Come You're Not Here?", "True Love", "Try", "Blow Me (One Last Kiss)", and "Slut Like You", along with other tracks from her discography. She later performed "Blow Me (One Last Kiss)" and "Try" on Today as part of their Toyota Concert Series. Pink also appeared on The View and The Daily Show singing "Blow Me (One Last Kiss)". Later the same month, the singer performed at the 2012 iHeartRadio Music Festival where her setlist included "Blow Me (One Last Kiss)" and "Try".

In Australia, Pink promoted The Truth About Love by performing "Blow Me (One Last Kiss)" and "True Love" on Today. She also performed "Try" during the fourth season of The X Factor Australia and held a one-night-only concert at the Forum Theatre, in Melbourne. On November 12, 2012, she performed during the "Power of Pink" benefit concert at Sony Pictures Studios, singing her previous singles as well as "How Come You're Not Here?", "Try", and "Blow Me (One Last Kiss)". A day later, Pink was featured on an episode of VH1 Storytellers. Her setlist included "Blow Me (One Last Kiss)", "How Come You're Not Here?", and she was accompanied on stage by Lily Allen and Nate Ruess during the performances of "True Love" and "Just Give Me a Reason", respectively. At the 2012 American Music Awards, Pink performed "Try" and recreated the highly choreographed routine from the music video joined by her male dancer, Colt Prattes. The performance was met with positive reviews from critics.

Pink then returned to Europe to further promote the album. On November 30, 2012, Pink played a private concert organized by NRJ at Salle Wagram in Paris, France. The following day, she appeared on Swiss television show Benissimo and sang "Try". Pink performed the song again on the semi-finale of the ninth series of The X Factor UK. On December 8, 2012, she performed "Try" on German television show Wetten, dass..?, accompanied by Prattes. The singer was a main headliner at the 2012 edition of Jingle Bell Ball, an annually-held event promoted by Capital FM, which took place at the O2 Arena in London. Among the songs performed were "Blow Me (One Last Kiss)" and "Try". She later performed "Try" on The Graham Norton Show, in an appearance aired on December 31, 2012. At the 56th Annual Grammy Awards on January 26, 2014, Pink performed a medley of "Try" and "Just Give Me a Reason". Pink descended from the ceiling on ropes and performed "Try" while flying above the audience and executing an aerial dancing routine. She then landed on stage and sang "Just Give Me a Reason" joined by Nate Ruess.

Singles

The album's lead single, "Blow Me (One Last Kiss)" was released on July 2, 2012, a week ahead of schedule due to a demo leaking onto the Internet. It received positive commentary from music critics; reviewers complimented Pink's vocals and the song's anthemic chorus, being heralded as a return to form. The single topped the charts in Australia and Hungary while reaching a peak of number five on the Billboard Hot 100. An accompanying music video, directed by Dave Meyers, was released on July 26, 2012. It depicts Pink taking revenge and crashing the wedding of a former lover.

"Try" was released as the album's second single on September 6, 2012. The song attained top ten status in the United States and other 15 countries, including Australia, Canada, Germany, and the United Kingdom. Its music video was directed by Floria Sigismondi and choreographed by the GoldenBoyz and Sebastien Stella. Released on October 10, 2012, the video portrays Pink and her lover, played by Prattes, expressing their intense love story and frustrations through an elaborate choreography inspired by the Apache dance.

"Just Give Me a Reason" was released as the third single from the album, on February 26, 2013. The song was a commercial success, topping the charts in over ten countries and reaching the top ten elsewhere. In the United States, "Just Give Me a Reason" spent three consecutive weeks at number one on the Billboard Hot 100 chart, becoming Pink's fourth number-one single in the country. The accompanying music video, directed by Diane Martel, is mainly set on a floating mattress surrounded by mist and water and features a cameo from Pink's husband.

The album's fourth single, "True Love", was released on June 28, 2013. The song performed moderately on the charts, peaking within the top 40 charts in over 15 countries, including Australia, Canada, and Italy. An accompanying music video showing scenes of Pink playing, fighting, and riding bicycles with her family, interspersed with clips from a tour performance, was released on July 1, 2013. "Walk of Shame" was serviced to Australian contemporary hit radio stations on September 25, 2013, as the album's fifth single. The song's music video consists of a compilation of concert and behind-the-scenes footage from The Truth About Love Tour. In Europe, "Are We All We Are" was released as the final single from The Truth About Love on October 31, 2013.

Tour

The album received further promotion from The Truth About Love Tour, which started on February 13, 2013, in Phoenix, Arizona. The first leg consisted of 26 dates, visiting venues in North America, while the second row of shows comprised 30 concerts throughout Europe. The third leg included 46 dates in Australia and ran from June to September. Pink played an additional 40 shows in North America, which commenced on October 10, 2013, and concluded on January 31, 2014. The tour garnered positive reviews, with critics commending her vocals, stage presence, and aerial acrobatics. It became the third highest-grossing tour of 2013 and grossed a total of $183 million with over 1.9 million ticket sales. A video album of the tour was released on November 15, 2013, as DVD, Blu-ray, and digital download.

Critical reception

The Truth About Love was met with generally positive reviews. At Metacritic, which assigns a normalized rating out of 100 to reviews from mainstream publications, the album received an average score of 77, based on 16 reviews. Aggregator AnyDecentMusic? gave the album 6.3 out of 10, based on their assessment of the critical consensus.

Kyle Anderson of Entertainment Weekly commended the songs' confessional nature, describing the record as "honesty you can dance to". In a positive review for MSN Music, Robert Christgau viewed that, apart from its last two songs, the album "hit[s] every time" and summarized it as "a recorded image of [Pink's] feisty, heartfelt, all-over-the-place love/sex life". Stephen Thomas Erlewine from AllMusic applauded the album for "expanding and deepening [Pink's] music without succumbing to stuffy pretension", calling it "weird and willfully, proudly human". Robert Copsey of Digital Spy deemed The Truth About Love as a "fierce and thoroughly entertaining record". Billboards Andrew Hampp rated the record 4.5 out of 5 stars and hailed it as being a "peerlessly witty, endlessly melodic tour de force".

Caryn Ganz of Spin compared the album favorably to Stronger (2011) by Kelly Clarkson, stating that both records "are stocked with confidence-jolting up-tempo jams, broken-hearted weepers, and candid explorations of their own flaws". Ganz also remarked that both singers "have dug in their heels even harder for guitar pop", as opposed to following current musical trends. The Boston Globes writer Sarah Rodman praised the album for juxtaposing "rock muscle, pop froth, and expressions both heartfelt and petulant". Jon Pareles of The New York Times found the recording to be "[recognizing] some nonstorybook sides of romance". Writing for The Guardian, Caroline Sullivan noted that the singer "funnels her thoughts into some of the most pungent songs in pop" and commended her for having "the nous to convert raw emotion into pop-punk earworms". However, she criticized the ballads which "detract from an otherwise fierce record".

Hermoine Hoby of The Observer favored its "workmanlike ballads delivered with beyond-workmanlike shading" over its "chunky guitar pop stuffed with shouty, bad-girl choruses", which she considered dominant on the album. Greg Kot of the Chicago Tribune perceived "formula production and hack songwriting", but complimented Pink's personality showcased in its "handful" of worthy tracks. Jody Rosen, writing for Rolling Stone, viewed The Truth About Love as "supercatchy", although he opined that the album "devolves into self parody" as "Pink strains to shock, peppering songs with gratuitous curse words". Sal Cinquemani from Slant Magazine gave the album a mixed review, rating it three out of five stars. He felt that the record was formulaic and denounced it as "competently, often frustratingly more of the same from an artist who still seems capable of much more".

Accolades
Spin listed the album at number 11 on their list of best pop albums released in 2012, with editor Ganz noting that Pink "got over her pop-star identity crisis" and presented her "genuine" side. In his list for The Barnes & Noble Review, Christgau named The Truth About Love the fourth best album of 2012. Billboard ranked it as one of the best albums of the 2010s decade, with reviewer Sarah Grant affirming that Pink "created a ramshackle masterpiece that reminds us of what it's really like to be human" by "figuring out how the foreign experiences of a family-woman fit into [her] repertoire". The album was nominated for Best Pop Vocal Album at the 55th Annual Grammy Awards, while "Just Give Me a Reason" received nominations for Song of the Year and Best Pop Duo/Group Performance, respectively, at the 56th ceremony. In Canada, the album was nominated for International Album of the Year at the Juno Awards of 2014.

Commercial performance

The Truth About Love became Pink's first number-one album in the United States, debuting at the summit of the Billboard 200 chart with 280,000 copies sold and earning her biggest first-week sales at the time. The following week, the album fell to number four with sales of 94,000 copies. It sold 945,000 copies by the end of 2012, finishing as the country's 12th highest-selling album of the year. By December 2013, the album had sold over 1.83 million copies. It was certified 3× Platinum by the Recording Industry Association of America (RIAA) in August 2017 for selling over three million album-equivalent units in the US. In Canada, The Truth About Love debuted atop the Canadian Albums Chart. With 28,000 copies sold in the first week, it became Pink's first number-one album there. It was certified 3× Platinum by Music Canada (MC) for shipments of 240,000 copies.

In the United Kingdom, The Truth About Love entered the UK Albums Chart at number two, selling 80,000 copies, behind The Killers' Battle Born which sold 94,000 copies. As of February 2019, the album has sold 907,000 sales in the UK and has been certified 3× Platinum by the British Phonographic Industry (BPI). In France, it debuted at number four on the official album chart with 17,855 traditional units. The Syndicat National de l'Édition Phonographique (SNAP) certified the album platinum, which denotes sales of 100,000 copies. In other regions, The Truth About Love reached number one on charts in Austria, Germany, Sweden, and Switzerland, and peaked within the top ten in Denmark, Italy, the Netherlands, and Spain, among others.

In Australia, The Truth About Love debuted at number one on the ARIA Albums Chart with first-week sales of 74,293 copies, becoming Pink's fourth number-one album in the country and claiming the biggest single-week sales of 2012. The album spent ten non-consecutive weeks at the summit of the chart, becoming the longest-running number-one album since Adele's 21 (2011). The Truth About Love was the nation's highest-selling album of both 2012 and 2013, thus becoming the first album to ever achieve this feat. As of January 2014, it has sold 560,000 copies and was certified 9× Platinum by the Australian Recording Industry Association (ARIA) for selling over 630,000 units. The album experienced similar success in New Zealand, debuting at the top of the Official New Zealand Music Chart and spending six non-consecutive weeks there. It received a 4× Platinum certification from Recorded Music NZ (RMNZ) for shipments of over 60,000 units. Globally, The Truth About Love was the seventh best-selling album of 2012, with sales of 2.6 million copies, and by November 2016, it had sold an estimated seven million copies worldwide.

Track listing

Notes
  signifies a co-producer
  signifies an additional producer

Credits and personnel

Credits are adapted from the liner notes of The Truth About Love.

Studios
Recording locations

 Earthstar Creation Center (Venice, California)
 Conway Studios (Los Angeles)
 Suite 203
 Effigy Studios (Ferndale, Michigan)
 The Modern Dirt laboratories (London)
 Fishhead Music (Gothenburg, Sweden)
 Ruby Red Studios (Santa Monica, California)
 West Triad Studios (Venice, California)

Additional recording locations

 Enormous Studios guitars recording
 Capitol Studios (Hollywood) strings recording

Engineering locations

 Earthstar Creation Center (Venice, California)
 Ruby Red Studios (Santa Monica, California)
 Sonora Recorders (Los Angeles)
 Echo Studio (Los Angeles)
 Modern World Studios (Tetbury)
 Turtle Sound Studios (Weston, Connecticut)
 Monster Island (Nashville, Tennessee)
 New Track City (London/Los Angeles)
 Ballroom West (Los Angeles)
 Mission Sound (Brooklyn)

Mixing and mastering locations

 Eldorado Recording Studios (Los Angeles)
 MixStar Studios (Virginia Beach, Virginia)
 The Ballroom Studio (Los Angeles)
 Super Sonic Scale (France)
 Ruby Red Studios (Santa Monica, California)

Musicians

 Pink lead vocals, background vocals
 Butch Walker background vocals, arranger
 Phillip A. Peterson strings
 Zachary Baird keyboards
 Greg Kurstin keyboards, guitar, bass, piano
 Kevin Dukes guitars
 Jeff Bhasker keyboards, synthesizer
 Nate Ruess featured vocals
 Anders Mouridsen guitars
 Lily Rose Cooper featured vocals
 Willow Sage Hart bells, bass
 Max Martin keyboards, background vocals
 Shellback guitars, bass, drums, keyboards, background vocals
 Billy Mann arranger, acoustic guitars, electric guitars, bass, piano, live percussion
 David Schuler arranger, acoustic guitars, electric guitars, bass, drums
 Jonathan Yudkin strings
 Eminem featured vocals
 Erik Alcock guitars
 Chin Injeti bass
 DJ Khalil keyboards
 Danny Keyz keyboards
 Liz Rodrigues background vocals
 Tracklacers arranger, bass, keyboards
 Pete Wallace string arrangements
 Dan Wilson piano, acoustic guitar, keyboards
 Steve Wolf tambourine
 David Campbell string arrangements, conducting
 Charlie Bisharat strings concertmaster
 Sara Parkins violin
 Tamara Hatwan violin
 Andrew Duckels viola
 Steve Richards cello
 Dave Stone bass
 Oli Kraus additional cello, viola, violin
 Jake Sinclair background vocals
 Boyce Buchanan children's vocal
 Barbara Klaskin Silberg children's vocal directing
 Eg White instruments, background vocals
 Robin Lynch electric guitars
 Niklas "Nikey" Olovson bass
 Mark Shulman drums
 Justin Derrico lead electric guitars

Production

 Butch Walker producer, music, songwriting, keyboard programming
 John Hill producer, music, songwriting
 Emile Haynie producer, music, songwriting
 Jake Sinclair music, engineer
 Pink songwriting, executive producer
 Laura Sisk engineer
 Rich Costey mixing
 Chris Kasych Pro Tools engineer
 Eric Isip assistant engineered for mix
 Greg Kurstin songwriting, producer, programming, engineer, mixing
 Jesse Shatkin additional engineering
 Serban Ghenea mixing
 John Hanes engineered for mix
 Phil Seaford assistant engineered for mix
 Busbee songwriting
 Ben West songwriting
 Jeff Bhasker songwriting, producer, programming
 Nate Ruess songwriting
 John X Volaitis recording, assistant vocal recording
 Pawel Sek guitars recording
 Tyler Johnson guitars recording
 Tony Maserati mixing
 Justin Hergett assistant engineered for mix
 James Krausse assistant engineered for mix
 Lily Rose Cooper songwriting
 Max Martin songwriting, producer
 Shellback songwriting, producer, programming
 Sam Holland recording
 Billy Mann songwriting, producer, drum programming, engineer, keyboard programming
 David Schuler songwriting, additional production, drum programming, engineer, keyboard programming
 Mark Needham mixing
 Will Brierre assistant engineered for mix
 Pete Wallace engineer
 Veronica Ferraro mixing
 DJ Khalil songwriting, producer
 Chin Injeti songwriting, producer
 John Brown additional production
 Mike Strange vocal recording
 Jon Keep songwriting
 Steve Daly songwriting
 Tracklacers additional production, drum programming
 Jonathan Yudkin engineer
 Dan Wilson songwriting, producer
 John Rausch engineer
 Phil Allen engineer
 Oliver Straus engineer
 Charlie Paakkari strings recording
 Eg White songwriting, producer, engineer, programming
 Tom Coyne mastering
 Machopsycho producer, keyboard programming, engineer
 Niklas "Nikey" Olovson songwriting
 Robin Lynch songwriting
 Pete Wallace keyboard programming

Management and design

 Roger Davies  management
 Shady Farshadfar management
 Irene Taylor management
 Lisa Garrett management
 Andrew Macpherson photography
 Deborah Anderson photography
 Jeri Heiden art direction, designing
 Nick Steinhardt art direction, designing
 Donald Passman legal
 Gene Solomon legal
 Helen Stotler legal
 Nancy Chapman business affairs
 Teresa Polyak business affairs
 Otto Perez business affairs

Charts

Weekly charts

Year-end charts

Decade-end charts

All-time charts

Certifications

Release history

See also
 List of Billboard 200 number-one albums of 2012
 List of number-one albums of 2012 (Australia)
 List of number-one albums of 2013 (Australia)
 List of number-one hits of 2012 (Austria)
 List of number-one albums of 2012 (Canada)
 List of number-one albums from the 2010s (New Zealand)
 List of best-selling albums of the 2010s in the United Kingdom
 List of number-one singles and albums in Sweden
 List of number-one hits of 2012 (Switzerland)

References

Citations

Bibliography

2012 albums
Albums produced by Butch Walker
Albums produced by DJ Khalil
Albums produced by Emile Haynie
Albums produced by Greg Kurstin
Albums produced by Dan Wilson (musician)
Albums produced by Jeff Bhasker
Albums produced by Max Martin
Albums produced by Shellback (record producer)
Pink (singer) albums
RCA Records albums